The 2004 MLS SuperDraft, held in Charlotte, North Carolina on January 16, 2004, was the fifth incarnation of the annual Major League Soccer SuperDraft. The draft was most notable at the time for the selection of one of the youngest athletes in American sporting history, Freddy Adu, with the first pick by D.C. United. 

The draft also included Clint Dempsey (1st round) and teenager Michael Bradley (4th round). Both players  went on to earn over 120 caps with the U.S. national team; additionally, after an initial stint in MLS, both players had successful careers in Europe, and returned to MLS as designated players.

Player selection
Any player whose name is marked with an * was contracted under the Project-40 program.

Round one

Round one trades

Round two

Round two trades

Round three

Round three trades

Round four

Round four trades

Round five

Round five trades

Round six

Round six trades

Trade Note 
 MetroStars received a conditional 2004 SuperDraft pick from Chicago Fire in exchange for the rights to midfielder Andy Williams on 2003-03-27. Instead of the conditional pick, MetroStars received defender Edgar Bartolomeu from Chicago on 2003-06-25 to complete the trade.

Notable undrafted players
 Clyde Simms (MF, East Carolina University) — 220 MLS appearances.
 Troy Perkins (GK, Evansville)

See also 
 Draft (sports)
 Generation Adidas
 Major League Soccer
 MLS SuperDraft

References 

Major League Soccer drafts
SuperDraft
MLS SuperDraft
Soccer in North Carolina
Sports in Charlotte, North Carolina
Events in Charlotte, North Carolina
MLS SuperDraft